Eugenius "Eugène" Auwerkerken (born 10 December 1885, date of death unknown) was a Belgian gymnast who competed in the 1920 Summer Olympics. In 1920 he won the silver medal as member of the Belgian gymnastics team in the European system event.

References

External links
profile

1885 births
Year of death missing
Belgian male artistic gymnasts
Olympic gymnasts of Belgium
Gymnasts at the 1920 Summer Olympics
Olympic silver medalists for Belgium
Medalists at the 1920 Summer Olympics